Melattur Sahadevan is a Carnatic music vocalist.

References

External links 
The Hindu (15-02-2008) article about Nheralath Music Festival
keralaevents.com 

1956 births
Male Carnatic singers
Carnatic singers
Living people
20th-century Indian male classical singers
Singers from Kerala
People from Malappuram district
21st-century Indian male classical singers